The 2016–17 Melbourne City FC W-League season was the club's second season in the W-League, the premier competition for women's football in Australia. The team is based at the City Football Academy at La Trobe University and plays home games at both AAMI Park and CB Smith Reserve. The club was again by coached by manager Joe Montemurro, though in January 2017 Montemurro was promoted to assistant manager of the senior men's team and his role as manager was replaced by playing captain Jess Fishlock, who acted as captain/coach for the remainder of the season. The club's fixtures for the season were released on 31 August 2016.

Melbourne City finished fourth in the league, qualifying for the finals series. They defeated Perth Glory in the 2017 W-League grand final to claim their second consecutive W-League championship.

Players

Squad information

Transfers in

Transfers out

Managerial staff

Squad statistics

Competitions

W-League

League table

Results summary

Results by round

Matches

Finals series

References

External links
 Official Website

Melbourne City FC (A-League Women) seasons
Melbourne City